Dix Mountain is the sixth highest peak in the High Peaks Region of the Adirondack Park, and is located roughly on the boundary between the towns of North Hudson and Keene in Essex County, New York. The peak was named in 1837 after John Dix (1798–1879), who was the Secretary of State of New York at the time, and later became the state's governor.

While it stands somewhat south of the main High Peaks region (and in fact is at the center of its own Dix Mountain Wilderness Area) and is more difficult to reach and steep and challenging to climb, the mountain enjoys great popularity with serious hikers not only due to its status as a required peak for Adirondack Forty-Sixers but for open views of the region from its summit, almost as good as those to be found at nearby Mount Marcy with far less crowds.

Dix is also the gateway to four other High Peaks in the Dix Range, all of them, unlike Dix itself, officially trailless: Hough, Macomb, South Dix and Grace Peak. One of the most difficult Adirondack peakbagging challenges is to do all five in the same day; while many have, most hikers prefer to break the trips up into separate assaults on Dix and/or one of the others.

The mountain was reportedly first climbed by a man named Rykert in the course of surveying the town line.

Hikers commonly choose to climb Dix from the south by taking the Elk Lake Trail from the similarly named lake toward Hunters Pass, where a spur leads up to Dix. Less frequently, a lengthy northern ascent can start from the Ausable Club in St. Huberts.

Gallery

Notes

External links 
 
 
 

Adirondack High Peaks
Mountains of Essex County, New York
Mountains of New York (state)